Lolly may refer to:

Candy
Lolly, a short form of lollipop (a kind of confectionery on a stick)
Lolly, in Australian and New Zealand English, a piece of what is called candy in American English or sweets in British English

Art, entertainment, and media

Lolly Allen, a fictional character in the Australian soap opera Neighbours
Lolly Whitehill, a recurring character in the television series Orange Is the New Black
"Lolly" (song), a 2013 song by Maejor Ali, featuring Juicy J and Justin Bieber
 "Lolly, Lolly, Lolly, Get Your Adverbs Here", a song from Schoolhouse Rock

People
Lolly (singer) (born 1977), British pop star
Lolly Adefope, British comedian
Emmanuel Lolly Debattista (1929–2021), Maltese soccer player and manager
Candido "Lolly" Vasquez-Vegas, former guitarist and vocalist of the band Redbone
Emmanuel Lolly Vella (1933-2012), Australian association footballer
Elizabeth Yeats (1868-1940) nicknamed Lolly, British book publisher, sister of the poet W. B. Yeats

Other uses
Lolly Moor, a reserve in Norfolk, England

See also
Lollipop (disambiguation)
Jolly Ranchers